The Arroyo Grande IOOF Hall is a building in Arroyo Grande, California, that was built in 1902. The building housed the town's chapter of the Independent Order of Odd Fellows, which was established in 1887. The order planned a two-story building with a storefront on the first floor; the building is one of the tallest in downtown Arroyo Grande. The sandstone building was designed in the Romanesque style and features segmentally arched windows and doors and a crenellated parapet with a large merlon in the center. In 1985, the Odd Fellows lodge disbanded, and the building is now owned by the South County Historical Society. It was listed on the National Register of Historic Places in 1991.

References

External links

Odd Fellows buildings in California
Commercial buildings completed in 1902
Buildings and structures in San Luis Obispo County, California
Clubhouses on the National Register of Historic Places in California
National Register of Historic Places in San Luis Obispo County, California
Romanesque Revival architecture in California